Whitemud Watershed Wildlife Management Area is a wildlife management area made up of several widely spaced units in the upper reaches of the watershed of the Whitemud River, Manitoba, Canada. It was established in 1998 under the Manitoba Wildlife Act.

See also
 List of wildlife management areas in Manitoba
 List of protected areas of Manitoba

References

External links
 Whitemud Watershed Wildlife Management Area
 iNaturalist: Whitemud Watershed Wildlife Management Area

Protected areas established in 1998
Wildlife management areas of Manitoba
Protected areas of Manitoba